James Fowler (1788 – October 18, 1873) was an American lawyer and politician.

Fowler, eldest child of Samuel Fowler and Jemima (Lyman) Fowler, was born in Westfield, Mass., in 1788, and died in the same town, October 18, 1873, aged 85. He was the last survivor of the Yale College class of 1807.

He studied law at the Litchfield Law School, but mainly followed agricultural pursuits in his native town. From 1820 to 1830 he was successively a member of both houses of the Massachusetts State Legislature. He was also one of the Massachusetts Governor's Council, and filled a number of local offices. He was especially interested in education, and was from 1826 to 1838 one of the trustees of Amherst College.

He married, first, Feb. 9, 1820, Lucy L., daughter of Major T. J. Douglas, who died July 16, 1840. He married, secondly, Oct. 6, 1841, Charlotte, daughter of Capt. Silas Whitney. He left one son, a graduate of Yale in 1839, and one daughter.

1788 births
1873 deaths
People from Westfield, Massachusetts
Yale College alumni
Litchfield Law School alumni
Massachusetts state senators
Members of the Massachusetts House of Representatives
Members of the Massachusetts Governor's Council
19th-century American politicians